

See also
King George's Fields

References

King George V
King George V
West Midlands
Lists of buildings and structures in the West Midlands (county)